Zhanna Gureyeva (born 10 June 1970) is a Belarusian female former track and field athlete who competed in the triple jump. She was a three-time representative of her native country at the World Championships in Athletics, featuring in 1993, 1995 and 1997, and making the final on the latter two occasions. Her lifetime best of  came in the qualifying round of the 1997 World Championships.

Her first international medal came at the 1998 European Cup, where she took bronze. She was also bronze medallist at the 1997 Summer Universiade. Gureyeva was a four-time national champion, winning at the Belarus Athletics Championships in 1995, 1997 and 1999, and indoors in 2002.

Born in Voronezh Oblast, she was invited to try out for athletics by a local coach, Alexander Sinkevich. She began training in seriousness with Eugene Rusakov. She studied sports at university and joined with the main coach of her career, Valery Bunin, in 1987. Following her retirement from competitive athletics, she continued in the sports field as a professor at the Belarusian State University of Physical Training.

International competitions

National titles
Belarus Athletics Championships
Triple jump: 1995, 1997, 1999
Belarus Indoor Championships
Triple jump: 2002

References

External links

Living people
1970 births
Sportspeople from Voronezh Oblast
Belarusian female triple jumpers
World Athletics Championships athletes for Belarus
Belarusian academics
Academics of physical education and sport
Universiade bronze medalists for Belarus
Universiade medalists in athletics (track and field)
Medalists at the 1997 Summer Universiade